Goodenia heppleana is a species of flowering plant in the family Goodeniaceae and is endemic to northern Australia. It is an erect or prostrate herb with lance-shaped leaves at the base of the plant and racemes of yellow flowers.

Description

Taxonomy and naming
This species was first formally described in 1918 by William Vincent Fitzgerald who gave it the name Calogyne heppleana. In 1990 Roger Charles Carolin changed the name to Goodenia heppleana in the journal Telopea. The specific epithet (heppleana) honours the surveyor William Hepple Brown, an officer of the Kimberley Survey Expedition, 1905.

Distribution and habitat
This goodenia grows in open forest and woodland in the north-east Kimberley region of Western Australia and in Arnhem Land in the Northern Territory.

Conservation status
Goodenia heppleana is classified as "not threatened" by the Government of Western Australia Department of Parks and Wildlife and as of "least concern" under the Northern Territory Government Territory Parks and Wildlife Conservation Act 1976.

References

heppleana
Eudicots of Western Australia
Plants described in 1918
Taxa named by William Vincent Fitzgerald
Endemic flora of Western Australia